is a subway station in Nerima, Tokyo, Japan, operated by Tokyo Metro.

Lines

Station layout
The station consists of an island platform serving two tracks. The platforms are equipped with Waist-height platform edge doors.

Platforms

History
The station opened on 24 June 1983 as Eidan-Akatsuka Station. It was renamed Chikatetsu-Akatsuka on 1 April 2004, coinciding with the privatization of Tokyo Metro (formerly known as "Eidan").

Waist-height platform edge doors were installed in September 2010.

Surrounding area
 Shimo-Akatsuka Station (on the Tōbu Tōjō Line)
 Jōrenji Temple 
 Hikarigaoka Park

References

External links

 Tokyo Metro station information 

Railway stations in Japan opened in 1983
Stations of Tokyo Metro
Tokyo Metro Yurakucho Line
Tokyo Metro Fukutoshin Line
Railway stations in Tokyo